The 2009–10 Drake Bulldogs men's basketball team represented Drake University during the 2009-10 NCAA Division I men's basketball season. The team, which plays in the Missouri Valley Conference (MVC), was led by second-year head coach Mark Phelps and played their home games at the Knapp Center. The Bulldogs finished the season 14–19, 7–11 in MVC play and lost in the quarterfinals of the 2010 Missouri Valley Conference men's basketball tournament to Northern Iowa.

Preseason
The team lost Josh Parker, who transferred to Dayton. Tyson Dirks is no longer on the roster.

Regular season

Roster

Schedule

|-
!colspan=9 style=| Exhibition

|-
!colspan=9 style=| Regular season

|-
!colspan=9 style=| Missouri Valley tournament

Notes and references

External links
 https://web.archive.org/web/20081007032553/http://www.godrakebulldogs.com/SportSelect.dbml?DB_OEM_ID=15700&KEY=&SPID=8121&SPSID=71122
 https://web.archive.org/web/20110711104323/http://www.godrakebulldogs.com/SportSelect.dbml?DB_OEM_ID=15700&KEY=&SPID=8121&SPSID=71124
 https://sports.yahoo.com/ncaab/teams/dar
 https://web.archive.org/web/20080214155445/http://msn.foxsports.com/cbk/team?statsId=170
 http://www.sportsline.com/collegebasketball/teams/page/DRA
 http://sports-ak.espn.go.com/ncb/clubhouse?teamId=2181
 http://www.sportingnews.com/cbasketball/teams/drake/index.html
 http://sportsillustrated.cnn.com/basketball/ncaa/men/teams/drake/
 https://swap.stanford.edu/20070921185749/http%3A//desmoinesregister.com/apps/pbcs.dll/section?category%3DSPORTS0204

Drake
Drake Bulldogs men's basketball seasons
Drake
Drake